Ron Kass (March 30, 1935 – October 17, 1986) was an American businessman, recording executive, manager of The Beatles, and film producer. Kass worked with at least four recording companies: Liberty, MGM, Warner Brothers, and Apple Records.

Early life
Born Ronald Stanley Kashinoff in Philadelphia, Pennsylvania, his family changed the name to Kass when they moved to California. He attended Fairfax High Schoolin Los Angeles where he played in a band that became Tijuana Brass and then got a degree in accounting from UCLA.

Career
Kass married his UCLA sweetheart, Anita, and started working for Liberty Records which was directly across from Hollywood High School. He was promoted to overseas manager and eventually president of Liberty. He started working for Apple Records, the label set up by The Beatles, in 1968 and 1969 which was when he divorced Anita.

He was effectively forced from his position at Apple by the Beatles' new manager Allen Klein after he was falsely accused of "financial impropriety" (he was succeeded in the position by his former deputy Jack Oliver).

Kass's film producing credits included Melody (1971), The Optimists (1973) starring Peter Sellers, Naked Yoga (1974) nominated for an Oscar for Best Documentary Short Subject, The Stud (1978) and The Bitch (1979) both based on novels by Jackie Collins, and starring her sister Joan Collins.

He and Collins appeared on Tattletales in 1977 & 1982.

Personal life
With Anita his first wife, they had their first son David, and then Kass moved to London but settled his family in Lugano, Switzerland, where they had two more sons, Roberto and Jonathan. After their divorce, Anita raised their children in Lugano. As adults their children later moved to the US.

In 1972, Kass married Joan Collins. They had a daughter, Katyana ("Katie"), born in 1972. Kass and Collins were divorced in 1983, but reportedly remained close. Collins provided for Kass's medical care when he was ill with terminal cancer, in addition to flying his sons from Switzerland to their father. Kass died from cancer in Los Angeles, California, at the age of 51 with Collins at his bedside.

References

External links

New York Times

1935 births
1986 deaths
American entertainment industry businesspeople
American film producers
Apple Records
20th-century British musicians
20th-century American businesspeople